Ann Njogu is a Kenyan activist. In 2010, she was the director of the Centre for Rights Education and Awareness, which among other things documented sexual- and gender-based violence after the Kenyan general election in December 2007. She was also a drafter of and lobbyist for Kenya’s Sexual Offences Act, which became law in 2006.

Background
In addition to her work on sexual and gender violence, Njogu was the Co-Chair of the Multi-Sectoral Committee on Constitutional Reform, the Co-Chair of the Joint Dialogue Forum on Constitutional Reform, and a delegate to the Bomas National Conference on Constitutional Reforms. In 2007, she was attacked and arrested by state security forces for demanding that Members of Parliament review their salaries, which were very large despite Kenya's poverty. She and the others who were arrested filed a Constitutional reference popularly known as "Ann Njogu and others versus the State," which was successful in limiting the time a Kenyan citizen could be held in custody to 24 hours. In 2008, she was a co-convenor of the Civil Society Congress, which worked to improve politics after the violence in the wake of the December 2007 Kenyan elections.

In 2008 she was beaten and sexually molested by the police when they arrested her and others for suggesting corruption might have occurred in the sale of the Grand Regency Hotel.

Njogu received a 2010 International Women of Courage award.

In 2012 she and her son were charged with assaulting her father but in 2013 they was acquitted.

References

Living people
Kenyan activists
Kenyan women activists
Kenyan women's rights activists
Year of birth missing (living people)
Recipients of the International Women of Courage Award